HMT may refer to:

Science

 Hexamethylenetetramine
 Histamine N-methyltransferase
 Histone methyltransferase
 Host modulatory therapy

Places

 Ham Street railway station, in England
 Hang Mei Tsuen stop, Hong Kong
 Hemet-Ryan Airport, California, United States

Organizations and Companies

 HMT Limited (Hindustan Machine Tools Limited), an Indian watch manufacturer
 Hochschule für Musik und Theater Rostock, a music and theatre school in Germany
 Zurich School of Music, Drama, and Dance, later merged into Zurich University of the Arts

Other

 Hamtai language, spoken in Papua New Guinea
 Royal Navy ship prefixes:
 His Majesty's Trawler (see trawlers of the Royal Navy)
 Hired Military Transport, troopship
 ship prefixes for His Majesty's Transport/Troopship/Tug 
 Abbreviation for HM Treasury